Raj Kumar Mehra (16 April 1918 – 5 January 2001) was an Indian cyclist. He competed at the 1948 Olympics and the 1952 Olympics. At the 1951 Asian Games he won the silver medal in the team pursuit.

References

External links
 

1918 births
2001 deaths
Indian male cyclists
Olympic cyclists of India
Cyclists at the 1948 Summer Olympics
Cyclists at the 1952 Summer Olympics
People from Rajpur Sonarpur
Sportspeople from West Bengal
Asian Games medalists in cycling
Cyclists at the 1951 Asian Games
Medalists at the 1951 Asian Games
Asian Games silver medalists for India